Itachuna is a village and Itachuna-Khanyan is a gram panchayat in Pandua CD Block in Chinsurah subdivision of Hooghly district in the state of West Bengal, India.

Demographics
As per the 2011 Census of India, Itachuna had a total population of 1,451 of which 735 (51%) were males and 716 (49%) were females. Population below 6 years was 146. The total number of literates in Itachuna was 1,034 (79.23% of the population over 6 years).

Transport
A short stretch of Polba-Khanyan Road links Itachuna to SH 13/ GT Road. Nearest railway station is Khanyan railway station.

Education
Bejoy Narayan Mahavidyalaya, a general degree college, was established at Itachuna in 1950. It is affiliated with the University of Burdwan and offers honours courses in Bengali, English, Sanskrit, history, political science, philosophy, economics, mathematics, physics, chemistry, botany, zoology and nutrition.

Culture 

Itachuna Rajbari also known as "Bargee Danga" became a tourist spot of Hooghly district. This was established by Kundan family originated from Maratha in 1766. Now the palace has been transformed into a heritage hotel. It is known for being the shooting location of many Hindi and Bengali films like Lootera, Poran Jaye Jolia Re, Rajmohol etc.

References

Villages in Hooghly district